A brandistock (also called brandestoc, buttafuore or feather staff) was a short type of pole weapon which was used by both infantry and civilians alike, primarily police officers in Italy between the 16th and 19th centuries. The head consisted of either a single or a trio of long thin points, which were kept in a hollow aperture inside the rest of the shaft. A sharp thrust of the weapon forward propelled the heads out, where they could be readily locked in place. This weapon is essentially a spear with a sliding blade, or alternatively, a long handled out-the-front gravity knife.

References 

Polearms